Giuseppe Castagnoli (1754 – 1832) was an Italian painter, mainly of quadratura and ornamentation.

Biography
Known to be active in Prato in Tuscany, he was appointed as a teacher of ornamentation for the Academy of Fine Arts of Florence, and published in Florence a book titled Le regole pratiche di prospettiva per i giovani figuristi. He helped paint frescoes for the Hall of Bacchus in the Palazzina Reale delle Cascine of Florence.

References

1754 births
1832 deaths
People from Prato
18th-century Italian painters
Italian male painters
19th-century Italian painters
Painters from Tuscany
19th-century Italian male artists
18th-century Italian male artists